Mark L. Feidler (born c. 1958) is an American lawyer and businessman. He serves as the chairman of Equifax.

Early life
Feidler was born circa 1958. He graduated from Duke University in 1978, and he earned a JD from Vanderbilt University in 1981.

Career
Feidler began his career as a lawyer for King & Spalding from 1981 to 1986. He worked for Robinson-Humphrey Company (later SunTrust Banks) from 1986 to 1990, followed by BellSouth from 1991 to 2000, and AT&T Mobility from 2000 to 2004.

Feidler co-founded MSouth Equity Partners, a private equity firm, in 2007. He serves as a partner.

Feidler succeeded Richard F. Smith as the chairman of Equifax in the wake of the 2017 data breach.

References

Living people
1950s births
Duke University alumni
Vanderbilt University Law School alumni
American lawyers
American chairpersons of corporations
Equifax people